Chu Liu Hsiang and Hu Tieh Hua is a 1980 Taiwanese film directed by Lin Ying; written, produced and co-directed by Gu Long. The title characters are from Gu Long's Chu Liuxiang novel series.

Plot summary
Hu and Chief Xiang were traveling in the vast Gobi Desert. He saw a lady to meet a lady from Ulaanbaatar. This movie was set in the mid-Song Dynasty.

Cast
Liu Dekai as Chu Liuxiang (moustache portrayed like that of Lu Xiaofeng in that movie.)
James Tien as Hu Tiehua
Lee Kim-ping
Suen Ga-lam
Shally Yue
Liu Ping
Wang Suen
Cheung Pang
Wong Gwan
Yuen Sam
Yee Yuen
Kok Man-lai
Au Ba

External links

1980 films
Taiwanese martial arts films
Wuxia films
Works based on Chu Liuxiang (novel series)
Films based on works by Gu Long